Little Kelk is a small hamlet in the East Riding of Yorkshire, England. It forms part of the civil parish of Kelk.

In 1823 Little Kelk inhabitants numbered 51, two being farmers.

References

External links

Villages in the East Riding of Yorkshire